Louisa Maria Ghevaert (born September 1974) is a solicitor of the Senior Courts of England and Wales.

Education
Louisa Ghevaert read BA Degree in History (Hons) at the University of Bristol, before undertaking the Common Professional Entrance (CPE) and the Legal Practice Course (LPC) at the College of Law in Guildford.

Career 
Ghevaert specialises in fertility, surrogacy, donor conception, posthumous conception, adoption and family law, working on landmark legal cases for changes and improvements to fertility, children law, and family law for families in the UK. She is the founder of specialist fertility and family law firm Louisa Ghevaert Associates. In 2008, Ghevaert acted for British intended parents in Re X and Y (foreign surrogacy) 2008 EWHC 3030 (Fam), being the first case in UK legal history to test the law for British parents conceiving through an international commercial surrogacy arrangement in the Ukraine.

In 2009 Ghevaert acted for Melanie and Robert Gladwin saving their frozen embryos from destruction, following which the Department of Health issued a change to embryo storage law in the UK for surrogate pregnancies, for which she was named The Times Lawyer of the Week. In 2010, Ghevaert acted for British intended parents who conceived a child with a US surrogate in Re L (a minor) [2010] EWHC 3146 (Fam). The ruling resulted in a precedent that the welfare of the child is decisive over the public policy ban of commercial surrogacy except in the clearest cases of abuse of public policy.

Ghevaert acted for Donna and Dean Marshall in 2011, helping them win a rare legal battle for IVF funding on the NHS against their local hospital authority. In 2012, she acted for Andrea Heywood, who aged 24 was denied NHS funding for IVF by her local hospital authority for being too young. In 2014, Ghevaert acted for the intended father in a UK surrogacy dispute about a child’s care and parentage in JP v LP & Ors [2014] EWHC 595 (Fam). The legal ruling highlighted the risks of informal agreements and established a legal framework for cases where criteria for a parental order cannot be met following marital breakdown and divorce.

From 2014 to 2018, Ghevaert was a member of the cross-organizational Surrogacy UK Working Party on Surrogacy Law Reform and contributor to the report on surrogacy in the UK Myth busting and reform (2015). This informed parliamentary debate on surrogacy law reform and policy in The House of Lords in 2016 and subsequent work on reform of surrogacy law in the UK. She was part of the wife’s legal team in Y v A Healthcare NHS Trust & The HFEA & Ors 2018, a first-of-its kind legal ruling from the Court of Protection to extract and store sperm from a fatally injured man for use in posthumous fertility treatment. Ghevaert was awarded a place on The Lawyer Hot 100 List 2018 for her legal work on cases regarding the family, fertility and medical sectors. They described her "as an influential figure when it comes to ensuring fertility laws are fit for purpose in the 21st century".

Through 2018, 2019 and 2020, Ghevaert’s expert legal evidence in the Court of Appeal and the Supreme Court resulted in further legal rulings for a woman rendered infertile following a delay in detecting cancer in smear tests and biopsies, enabling for the first time recovery of damages for commercial surrogacy, donor conception and fertility treatment in the US, XX v Whittington Hospital NHS Trust [2018] EWCA Civ 2832 and Whittington Hospital NHS Trust v XX [2020] UKSC 14.

Publications 
Ghevaert is a specialist contributor on surrogacy law in practitioner reference book The International Family Law Practice. She also contributed to the book Legal and Regulatory Risks to Patients: The UK Context.

References

External links
 https://louisaghevaertassociates.co.uk/

Surrogacy
Living people
Family law in the United Kingdom
1974 births